Hugo Emiliano Rodríguez Chávez (born February 4, 1985, in Mexico City) is a former Mexican professional footballer who last played for Tapachula of Ascenso MX.

External links

Liga MX players
Living people
1985 births
Footballers from Mexico City
Association football defenders
Association football players not categorized by nationality
Mexican footballers